Badai Bungalow is an Indian Malayalam sketch comedy and celebrity talk show hosted by Ramesh Pisharody / Mithun Ramesh / Kalabhavan Navas, launched on Asianet from 2013 on every Saturday and Sunday at 8:00 PM. The second season of the show aired on every Friday at 9:30 PM.

Each episode features celebrity guests who usually appear to promote their latest films in a comedy-focused talk show format. Several stars from Malayalam film and television industry has participated in this show. This show is inspired by Comedy Nights with Kapil.

Mukesh is the permanent guest in the show playing the role of Badai Bungalow's owner.
Due to high viewership, the timing was changed to every Sunday at 8:30pm. The show replaced the long running comedy serial Cinemala. The show was wrapped on 3 June 2018 .

The second season of the series premiered since 3 March 2019 on Asianet channel.

Controversy 
Ramesh Pisharody's absence to the program for around a month has led to a decrease in the show's popularity. The alternative Rajesh also falls short as a replacement for Pisharody especially in bringing liveliness and ability to engage guests with humor rather than showering with all praise and epitomizing them as beyond human which fails to ground with the Malayali audience. His absence or speculated termination was met with high negative feedback through social media. Though the main host of the show Mukesh said this was a temporary setback.

Rajesh, who was already popular as an anchor, later added a video featuring him with Mukesh, Pisharody and Arya, clarifying this point. Later, Pisharody returned to the show, and the popularity increased again.

Cast

Popular guests (Season 1)

Cine Actors
Dulquer Salmaan
Hemanth Menon
Nishan K. P. Nanaiah
Jacob Gregory
Shritha Sivadas
Innocent 
Seema
Mohanlal
Ambika
Kaviyoor Ponnamma
Urvashi
Kalpana
Jayaram
Ratheesh Vegha
Akshara Kishor
Biju Menon
Miya
Shwetha Menon
Surabhi Lakshmi
Rima Kallingal
Lal
Arya (actor)
Jayasurya
Vinay Forrt
Lakshmi Gopalaswamy
Maniyanpilla Raju
Mala Aravindan
Govind Padmasoorya
Muthumani
Amala Paul
Mamta Mohandas
Navya Nair
Methil Devika
Manju Warriar
Manoj K. Jayan
Dileep
Bhavana
Anusree
Unni Mukundan
Tovino Thomas
Wamiqa Gabbi
Nivin Pauly
Abrid Shine
Aju Varghese 
Dhyan Sreenivasan
Vineeth Sreenivasan
Fahadh Faasil 
Soubin Shahir
Shamna Kasim
Honey Rose
Meera Nandan
Namitha Pramod
Narain
Riyaz Khan
Ashokan
Sai Kumar
Sibi Malayil 
Sithara
Kunchan (actor)
Kavya Madhavan
Nadia Moidu
Roma Asrani
Tini Tom
Guinness Pakru
Narayanankutty
Janardanan
Shivaji Guruvayoor
Prem Kumar
Salim Kumar
Harisree Ashokan
Kalabhavan Shajohn
Mamukkoya
Sudheer Karamana
Nadirshah
Renji Panicker
Alleppey Ashraf
Ranjini
Suresh Krishna

Music Industry

P. Jayachandran
K. G. Markose
Sayanora Philip
Stephen Devassy
Jyotsna Radhakrishnan
K. S. Chithra
Vidhu Prathap and Deepthi
Vaikom Vijayalakshmi

Serial actors

Sona Nair
Roopa Sree and Meghna Vincent
Rekha ratheesh and Kottayam Pradip
Lishoy and Leona Lishoy
Gayathri Arun
Sonu and Chitra Shenoy
Premi Vishwanath and Akshara Kishor
Kishor Satya and Renu Soudhar

Stand-up comedians
Kottayam Nazeer
Jayaraj Warrier

Sports
S. Sreesanth

Magician
 Magician Samraj

Popular Guests (season 2)

Awards 
 Asianet comedy awards 2015 – Best Anchor – Ramesh Pisharody
Flowers TV awards 2016–  Best Anchor – Ramesh Pisharody
 Asianet Television Awards 2016 – Golden Star of the year -Mukesh
 Asianet Television Awards 2016 – Entertainer of the year – Ramesh Pisharody
 2nd Asianet comedy awards 2016 – Versatile performance(TV)-Dharmajan
19th Asianet film awards Multifaceted personality of the year -Mukesh (actor)
Santhadevi memorial awards 2017 for Best comedy actress -Arya Rohit
3rd Asianet comedy awards – Best performer T.V. – Arya Rohit
 Asianet Television Awards 2018 – Golden Star of the year -Mukesh
 Asianet Television Awards 2018 – Best Comedian (non-fiction) -Manoj Guinness
3rd Anand TV film awards – Multifaceted personality(Tv&films) – Ramesh Pisharody

References 

Asianet (TV channel) original programming
Indian television talk shows
Malayalam-language television shows
2013 Indian television series debuts